Harald Adrian Fridrich (born 20 February 1998) is a Romanian professional footballer who plays as a central defender for Gloria Bistrița-Năsăud.

Club career
Fridrich made his debut in the Liga I during the last round of the 2015-2016 season against CSMS Iasi.

References

External links

Harald Fridrich at frf-ajf.ro

1998 births
Living people
Sportspeople from Timișoara
Romanian footballers
Association football wingers
Liga I players
Liga II players
Liga III players
ACS Poli Timișoara players
FC Ripensia Timișoara players
CS Gloria Bistrița-Năsăud footballers